Tsedevsürengiin Mönkhzaya (born 13 June 1986) is a retired Mongolian judoka. At the 2012 Summer Olympics she competed in the Women's 63 kg.  Her first and quickest performance was on the fourth day of the 2012 Summer Olympics on July 31, 2012, during the elimination round of 32 matches.  In three rounds totaling only 46 seconds, she expeditiously defeated Palau's 35-year-old Jennifer Anson.  In that match, Munkhzaya Tsedevsuren scored Ippon, the perfect score of 110 to 0.  In the 16th elimination round, she defeated Finland's Johanna Ylinen with a score of 100 to 0.  In the quarterfinal, she defeated France's Gevrise Emane and advanced to the semifinal of Table B where she lost to Slovenia's Urska Zolnir who went on to win the gold.  Munkhzaya Tsedevsuren fought for the bronze and lost to Japan's Yoshie Ueno.

References

External links
 
 
 Tsedevsürengiin Mönkhzayaa at The-Sports.org
 Tsedevsürengiin Mönkhzayaa at JudoInside.com (archive)

Mongolian female judoka
Living people
Olympic judoka of Mongolia
Judoka at the 2012 Summer Olympics
Judoka at the 2016 Summer Olympics
Judoka at the 2006 Asian Games
1986 births
Sportspeople from Ulaanbaatar
Asian Games competitors for Mongolia
20th-century Mongolian women
21st-century Mongolian women